James Hugh Colquhoun (18 October 1892 – 7 May 1949) was an Australian rules footballer who played with St Kilda in the Victorian Football League (VFL).

Notes

External links 

1892 births
1949 deaths
Australian rules footballers from Victoria (Australia)
St Kilda Football Club players
Australian military personnel of World War I